Freeport is a city in Walton County, Florida, United States. As of the 2010 census, the population recorded by the U.S. Census Bureau was 1,787. The 2018 population estimate was 2,472.

Geography
The city is located along U.S. Route 331 and Florida State Road 20. U.S. 331 runs from north to south to the east of the city, leading north  to DeFuniak Springs, the Walton County seat, and south  to U.S. Route 98 near Santa Rosa Beach. FL-20 runs from west to east through the main part of the city, leading east  to Ebro and west  to Niceville.

Freeport is situated at the junction of Four Mile Creek and Lafayette Creek, which empty out into LaGrange Bayou, which is connected to the Choctawhatchee Bay.

History

Freeport is said to have been established c. 1830. The settlement was originally known as Genoa, later Four Mile Landing, and finally Freeport. It was supposedly named Freeport because there was no charge to use the dock ('free port') at the junction of Four Mile Creek and Lafayette Creek.

Historically, the economy of Freeport was largely dependent on the local timber industry through sawmills and logging, as well as the processing of turpentine.

After the introduction of the railroad in Defuniak Springs, Freeport lost its position as the economic powerhouse in Walton County. Today it has a sizeable population of people who serve at Eglin AFB.

Demographics

2000 Census 
As of the census of 2000, there were 1,190 people, 500 households, and 327 families living in the city. The racial makeup of the city was 92.77% White, 2.35% African American, 2.18% Native American, 0.08% Asian, 0.17% Pacific Islander, 0.17% from other races, and 2.27% from two or more races. Hispanic or Latino of any race were 1.09% of the population.

There were 500 households, out of which 31.6% had children under the age of 18 living with them, 49.4% were married couples living together, 11.8% had a female householder with no husband present, and 34.6% were non-families. 28.8% of all households were made up of individuals, and 12.0% had someone living alone who was 65 years of age or older. The average household size was 2.38 and the average family size was 2.90.

In the city, the population was spread out, with 26.0% under the age of 18, 8.7% from 18 to 24, 27.5% from 25 to 44, 23.9% from 45 to 64, and 13.9% who were 65 years of age or older. The median age was 38 years. For every 100 females, there were 99.3 males. For every 100 females age 18 and over, there were 98.4 males.

The median income for a household in the city was $25,735, and the median income for a family was $33,214. Males had a median income of $31,375 versus $19,219 for females. The per capita income for the city was $14,114. About 18.0% of families and 21.4% of the population were below the poverty line, including 26.0% of those under age 18 and 23.2% of those age 65 or over.

2010 Census 
As of the census of 2010, there were 1,787 people, 702 households, and 472 families living in the city. The racial makeup of the city was 87.6% White, 2.9% African American, 1.8% Native American, 1.7% Asian, 0.1% Pacific Islander, 0.1% from other races, and 2.4% from two or more races. Hispanic or Latino of any race were 9.1% of the population.

Schools 

 Freeport Elementary School
 Freeport Middle School
 Freeport High School

References

Cities in Walton County, Florida
Populated places on the Intracoastal Waterway in Florida
Cities in Florida
1830s establishments in Florida
Populated places established in 1830